Yannick Veilleux (born February 22, 1993) is a Canadian professional ice hockey player. He is currently playing with Eisbären Berlin in the Deutsche Eishockey Liga (DEL). Veilleux was selected by the St. Louis Blues in the 4th round (102nd overall) of the 2011 NHL Entry Draft.

Playing career
Veilleux was selected second overall by Shawinigan Cataractes in the 2009 QMJHL Entry Draft. He led the Cataractes to win the 2012 Memorial Cup before being traded, prior to the start of the 2012–13 season, to the Moncton Wildcats in exchange for defenceman Brandon Gormley.

On March 6, 2013, the St. Louis Blues signed Veilleux to a three-year, entry-level contract. For the duration of his rookie contract with the Blues, Veilleux remained primarily with AHL affiliate's, the Peoria Rivermen and Chicago Wolves, appearing in 167 games.

Veilleux was not tendered a qualifying offer at the conclusion of his contract with the Blues and remained an unsigned free agent heading into the 2016–17 season. On October 12, 2016, Veilleux agreed to a one-year AHL contract with the St. John's IceCaps, affiliate to the Montreal Canadiens. In the 2016-17 season, Veilleux split the season between the IceCaps and secondary affiliate, the Brampton Beast. He featured in 53 games, adding to the forward depth of the IceCaps with 6 goals and 16 points.

As a free agent, Veilleux opted to remain within the Canadiens organization, signing a one-year AHL contract with new affiliate, the Laval Rocket, on July 20, 2017. In the 2017–18 season, he appeared in a depth forward line role with the Rocket, contributing with 3 goals and 7 points in 52 games.

After two seasons within the Canadiens organization, Veilleux left as a free agent and later agreed to a one-year AHL contract with the Rochester Americans, affiliate to the Buffalo Sabres, on August 3, 2018. In the 2018–19 season, Veilleux made 50 appearances for the Americans in a checking-line role, notching 5 goals and 8 points.

Having played the last five seasons primarily in the AHL, Veilleux as a free agent opted to return to the Kalamazoo Wings of the ECHL, signing a one-year contract on October 1, 2019.

On March 17, 2021, Veilleux was suspended two games by the AHL for using an obscene gesture during a game versus the Toronto Marlies. He was suspended again a few games later following a knee-on-knee hit on  Martin Pospisil. Veilleux was once again suspended on May 6, 2021, a one-game ban for boarding.

Following two productive seasons with the Rocket, Veilleux left North America as a free agent, signing his first contract abroad with German club, Eisbären Berlin of the DEL, on June 29, 2021.

Career statistics

Regular season and playoffs

International

Awards and honours

References

External links

1993 births
Living people
Brampton Beast players
Canadian ice hockey left wingers
Chicago Wolves players
Eisbären Berlin players
Kalamazoo Wings (ECHL) players
Laval Rocket players
Moncton Wildcats players
Peoria Rivermen (AHL) players
Rochester Americans players
Shawinigan Cataractes players
St. John's IceCaps players
St. Louis Blues draft picks
Ice hockey people from Quebec